Landon Donovan is a professional soccer player who played for the United States men's national soccer team from 2000 to 2014. In his 157 appearances for the United States, he scored 57 goals, making him the country's all-time male top scorer. Since July 22, 2017, Donovan has been tied with Clint Dempsey as the all-time male top scorer.

Donovan scored in his debut for the United States, a 2–0 win over Mexico in a friendly played on October 25, 2000. His first competitive goal came on January 19, 2002, against South Korea in the 2002 CONCACAF Gold Cup. A few months later, he played in his first FIFA World Cup, scoring against Poland on June 14, 2002, and Mexico on June 17, 2002. During the 2006 FIFA World Cup qualification campaign, Donovan scored six goals to help the United States qualify for the 2006 FIFA World Cup, where he did not score.

On January 20, 2008, Donovan scored his 35th goal, against Sweden, surpassing Eric Wynalda to become the United States's all-time male top goalscorer. At the 2010 FIFA World Cup, Donovan scored three goals, against Slovenia and Algeria in the group stage and Ghana in the Round of 16. His goal against Algeria, which took the United States into the knockout round, was named the second most significant goal in United States history by Sports Illustrated in May 2014. Donovan scored five goals for the United States during their victory at the 2013 CONCACAF Gold Cup, sharing the top goalscorer award with American teammate Chris Wondolowski and Panamanian striker Gabriel Torres. Donovan retired from international soccer on October 10, 2014, having not participated in the 2014 FIFA World Cup.

Donovan has scored three hat-tricks during his international career: against Cuba in the 2003 CONCACAF Gold Cup (where he scored four goals), against Ecuador in a 2007 friendly, and against Scotland in a 2012 friendly. The plurality of Donovan's goals came in friendlies, with 19 in 63 caps. He scored most of his competitive goals in the CONCACAF Gold Cup, at 18 in 34 matches, followed by FIFA World Cup qualification at 13 in 40 matches. Donovan scored five goals in 12 FIFA World Cup matches at the 2002 and 2010 editions. He also scored twice during the 2009 FIFA Confederations Cup, including once in the final against Brazil.

International goals
"Score" represents the score in the match after Donovan's goal. "Score" and "Result" list the United States' goal tally first.

Statistics
Sources: RSSSF and US Soccer

By year

By competition

See also
List of men's footballers with 50 or more international goals

References

Soccer in the United States lists
Donovan
United States men's national soccer team records and statistics